Ras and Rab interactor 1 is a protein that in humans is encoded by the RIN1 gene.

Interactions
RIN1 has been shown to interact with HRAS.

Additionally, RIN1 binds and activates ABL family tyrosine kinases.

References

Further reading